Power Ballads is the third studio album by London Elektricity, released in October 2005 through Hospital Records. It features vocals by Liane Carroll and MC Wrec.

Track listing

References 

2005 albums
London Elektricity albums
Hospital Records albums